The Coalition for Deep Space Exploration is a United States space advocacy organization for space industry businesses and non-profit groups supporting continued government investment in space exploration.

Presidents and CEOs
Mary Lynne Dittmar, founder, 2015 - 2021
Frank Slazer, 2021 - present

Founding Members
Members:
Aerojet Rocketdyne
Orbital ATK
Boeing
Lockheed Martin
Northrop Grumman

Silver Members

Futuramic Tool and Engineering
Jacobs Engineering
Moog Inc.

Members

Abacus Technology Corporation
Ampac
ASRC Federal
Baker Industries, a Lincoln Electric Company
Barrios Technologies
Craig Technical Consulting, Inc.
Craig Technologies Aerospace Solutions, LLC
DCX-CHOL Enterprises
Dese Research Inc.
Dynetics, Inc.
EMF, Inc.
Futuramic Tool and Engineering Company
Geocent, LLC
Honeywell
Houston Precision Fasteners, Lp.
ICF Mercantile, Inc.
ION Corporation
ISYS Technologies
L-3 Cincinnati Electronics
L-3 Communications
MEI Technologies
MRI Technologies
nLogic, LLC
Onyx Aerospace
Paragon
RDI Engineering, LLC
Standex Engineering Technologies Group
SGT, Inc.
Spincraft
UTC Aerospace Systems
Vacco
Votaw Precisions Technology, Inc.
Weetech, Inc.
WireMasters

Partner Associations
Partners:
Challenger Center for Space Science Education 
Citizens for Space Exploration
National Space Society

Board of Advisors
The circa 2015 Board of Advisors
Penelope J. Boston, Ph.D. – speleologist
Bob Crippen – former Shuttle astronaut 
Frederick D. Gregory - former Shuttle astronaut
Gerry Griffin – former NASA flight director and former NASA Deputy Administrator
Wayne Hale - former Space Shuttle Program Manager and former Space Shuttle Flight Director
Bernard Harris – former Shuttle astronaut and first African American to walk in space
Steven Hawley - former Shuttle astronaut
Henry R. Hertzfeld - former senior economist and policy analyst at NASA
Thomas David Jones - former Shuttle astronaut
Nick Lampson - former Congressman from Texas' 22nd Congressional District
Paul Spudis - geologist and lunar scientist
Doug Cooke - former NASA Associate Administrator
Dan Dumbacher] -  former NASA Deputy Associate Administrator

Honorary Board Members
Honorees:
Jake Garn – first member of Congress to fly in space (former U.S. Senator from Utah)
Joseph Kerwin – former Skylab astronaut 
Gene Kranz – former Apollo flight director 
Jim Lovell - former NASA Astronaut and commander of the Apollo 13 mission

See also
Space Exploration
List of astronomical societies
NASA

References

External links

Space organizations
Astronomy organizations
Non-profit organizations based in the United States
Scientific organizations based in the United States
Space colonization
Space advocacy organizations